The Inari Shingyō (稲荷心経; lit. "Inari Heart Sutra") is an apocryphal sutra compiled in Japan and recited as a form of worship to the kami Inari.

Before the Meiji period, Buddhism and Shinto in Japan were not mutually exclusive religions, which allowed the recitation of this text to become an established practice at shrines such as Fushimi Inari-taisha.

Origin
It is believed that the Inari Shingyō was first compiled at Aizen-ji, a branch temple of the Shingon Tō-ji and jingū-ji of Fushimi Inari-taisha, by the head priest Tenna (天阿). In his votive text Inari Ichiryū Daĳi (稲荷一流大事), Tenna included mantras, prayers, and norito that would result in the formation of the Inari Shingyō.

As may be expected, there is no Sanskrit original of this text, nor does a copy exist in any extant Chinese-language Buddhist canons. The Inari Shingyō is a Japanese original text grounded in the Inari faith and Shinbutsu-shūgō traditions based at Aizen-ji.

Text

See also
Norito
Heart Sutra
Shugendō

References

Post-canonical Buddhist texts
Inari faith
Shinbutsu shūgō
Japanese Buddhist texts